Boeke is a surname. Notable people with the surname include:

Harry Boeke (1883–1936), American businessman and politician
Jet Boeke, Dutch children's author
Jim Boeke, American football player
Kees Boeke, Dutch educator
Kees Boeke (musician), Dutch musician

See also
Mongolian wrestling